Peter John Hughes  (born 14 September 1953) is a British diplomat. From 2013 to 2018 he was the British High Commissioner to Belize.

Hughes joined the Foreign and Commonwealth Office (FCO) in 1976 and served in Islamabad, Rome, Warsaw, Sydney, Castries, Colombo and Kabul before being appointed Ambassador to North Korea in 2008 where he served until 2011. In 2009 he wrote a blog entry that noted the fair weather and festive mood in Pyongyang during that year's parliamentary election, prompting accusations in the British and South Korean press that he was an apologist for the North Korean government.

Honours
Hughes was appointed Officer of the Order of the British Empire (OBE) in the 2012 Birthday Honours.

References

1953 births
Living people
Ambassadors of the United Kingdom to North Korea
High Commissioners of the United Kingdom to Belize
Officers of the Order of the British Empire